MIKE 11 is a computer program that simulates flow and water level, water quality and sediment transport in rivers, flood plains, irrigation canals, reservoirs and other inland water bodies. MIKE 11 is a 1-dimensional river model. It was developed by DHI.

MIKE 11 has long been known as a software tool with advanced interface facilities. 
 Since the beginning MIKE 11 was operated through an efficient interactive menu system with systematic layouts and sequencing of menus. It is within that framework where the latest ‘Classic’ version of MIKE 11 – version 3.20 was developed. 

The new generation of MIKE 11 combines the features and experiences from the mike11
MIKE 11 ‘Classic’ period, with the powerful Windows based user interface including graphical editing facilities and improved computational speed gained by the full utilization of 32-bit technology.

Modules
The computational core of MIKE 11 is a hydrodynamic simulation engine, and this is complemented by a wide range of additional modules and extensions covering almost all conceivable aspects of river modeling. 

HD module: provides fully dynamic solution to the complete nonlinear 1-D Saint Venant equations, diffusive wave approximation and kinematic wave approximation, Muskingum method and Muskingum-Cunge method for simplified channel routing. It can automatically adapt to subcritical flow and supercritical flow. It has ability to simulate standard hydraulic structures such as weirs, culverts, bridges, pumps, energy loss and sluice gates. 

GIS Extension: an extension of ArcMap from ESRI providing features for catchment/river delineation, cross-section and Digital Elevation Model(DEM) data, pollution load estimates, flood visualisation/animation as 2D maps and results presentation/analysis using Temporal Analyst.

RR module: a rainfall runoff module, including the unit hydrograph method (UHM), a lumped conceptual continuous hydrological model and a monthly soil moisture accounting model. It includes an auto-calibration tool to estimate model parameter based on statistic data of comparison of simulated water levels/discharges and observations.

SO module: a structure operation module. It simulates operational structures such as sluice gates, weirs, culverts, pumps, bridges with operating strategies.

DB module: a dam break module. It provides complete facilities for definition of dam geometry, breach development in time and space as well as failure mode.

AUTOCAL module: an automatic calibration tool. It allows automisation of the calibration process for a wide range of parameters, including rainfall runoff parameters, Manning's number, head loss coefficients, water quality parameters etc.

AD module: an advection dispersion module. It simulates transport and spreading of conservative pollutants and constituents as well as heat with linear decay.

ST/GST module: a noncohesive sediment module. It simulates transport, erosion and deposition of non-cohesive and graded noncohesive sediments, including simulations of river morphology.

ACS module: a cohesive sediment module. It has 3-layer bed description, including quasi-2D erosion.

MIKE ECO Lab module: provides ecological modeling. It can simulate BOD/DO, Ammonia, Nitrate, Eutrophication, heavy metals and Wetlands. It includes standard templates that are well documented and have been used extensively in numerous applications worldwide. Based on predefined process templates, one can develop his/her own templates.

MIKE 11 Stratified module: models vertical density differences such as salinity or temperature in two-layer or multi-layered stratified water bodies.

MIKE 11 Real Time module: a simulation package and GIS front-end for setting up operational flood forecasting systems. It includes real-time updating and kalman filtering.

Applications
MIKE 11 has been used in hundreds of application around the world. Its main application areas are flood analysis and alleviation design, real-time flood forecasting, dam break analysis, optimisation of reservoir and canal gate/structure operations, ecological and water quality assessments in rivers and wetlands, sediment transport and river morphology studies, salinity intrusion in rivers and estuaries.

External links 

 DHI

Hydrology models
Hydraulic engineering
Environmental engineering
Physical geography